Tommaso Bellazzini (born 23 December 1987) is an Italian footballer who plays as an attacking midfielder or winger for Aglianese.

Club career
Born in Pisa, Bellazzini started his career at local Fiorentina. After playing two seasons with La Viola's Primavera team, he joined Pistoiese in co-ownership deal in 2005. Two years later, Bellazzini joined the latter in a full status. He was the regular of the Lega Pro Prima Divisione side and finished 16th with team in 2008–09 season.

On 4 July 2009, a few days before the club's bankruptcy, Bellazzini was loaned to Serie B side Cittadella, reuniting with former teammate Leonardo Pettinari, after sharing rooms at Fiorentina's youth squads.

On 25 January 2013 Bellazzini was signed by Vicenza, with Mattia Minesso moved to opposite direction.

On 2 August 2013 Bellazzini joined Lecce.

On 16 July 2014 Bellazzini was signed by Venezia.

On 26 June 2015 Bellazzini was signed by Pavia.

On 5 December 2019, he signed with Serie C club Giana Erminio until the end of the 2019–20 season.

On 30 September 2020, he joined Serie D club Aglianese.

International career
Bellazzini appeared with Italy under-18's in three matches during 2005.

References

External links
 
 Profile at Cittadella 
 Profile at FIGC  
 Profile at AIC.Football.it  
 

Italian footballers
Serie B players
Serie C players
Serie D players
ACF Fiorentina players
U.S. Pistoiese 1921 players
A.S. Cittadella players
L.R. Vicenza players
U.S. Lecce players
U.S. Alessandria Calcio 1912 players
A.S. Giana Erminio players
Aglianese Calcio 1923 players
Association football midfielders
Sportspeople from Pisa
1987 births
Living people
Footballers from Tuscany